was a town located in Oku District, Okayama Prefecture, Japan.

Overview
It faces Okayama City to the west, Ōku town to the north, and the Seto Inland Sea to the east and south. In particular, it is focused on tourism, and is called the "Aegean Sea of Japan". It is also one of okayama prefecture's leading mushroom producers and one of Japan's two largest olive producing areas, as well as Shodoshima, Kagawa Prefecture.

History
As of 2003, the town had an estimated population of 7,545 and a density of 274.36 persons per km². The total area was 27.50 km².

On November 1, 2004, Ushimado, along with the towns of Oku and Osafune (all from Oku District), was merged to create the city of Setouchi.

Dissolved municipalities of Okayama Prefecture
Populated places disestablished in 2004
2004 disestablishments in Japan
Setouchi, Okayama